The Bend Rockies were a minor league baseball team that played in Bend, Oregon. The Rockies were members of the Class A-Short Season Northwest League for three years, from 1992 through 1994 and were affiliated with the Colorado Rockies. Prior to 1995 season the franchise relocated to Portland, Oregon, where they continued play as the Portland Rockies.

History
Following two seasons operating as a co-op club, the bend franchise signed player development contract with the expansion Colorado Rockies. Bend was the first affiliate for the Colorado, who would not begin play until the following season in 1993. Bend, who had been named the Bucks for the past five years changed their moniker to mirror their parent club. The Bend Rockies began play in 1992.

The Rockies posted a record of 43-33 on the year to win the south division title. Bend faced the Bellingham Mariners for league championship, but were swept by the Baby M's in the three game championship series.

After reaching the peak of the Northwest League in their inaugural season, Bend would be unable to match the same level of success. The Rockies posted consecutive last place division finishes in 1993 and 1994. The 1994 season would the club's last in Bend. Portland, Oregon had been vacant since 1993 when then-owner Joe Buzas moved the Portland Beavers of the Class AAA Pacific Coast League to Salt Lake City. With Oregon's largest city open, the franchise opted to fill the void by relocating. Since the departure of the Bend Rockies, affiliated professional baseball has yet to return to Central Oregon. The only professional team to play in Bend since was the Bend Bandits of the Western Baseball League; the Bandits folded in 1998.

Ballpark
The Rockies played at Vince Genna Stadium located in Bend, Oregon.

Identity
Initially, owner Jack Cain wanted to maintain the Bend Bucks . At the insistence of the Colorado Rockies general manager Bob Gebhard, Bend adopted the nickname of their parent club. The team's colors were purple, black, silver, and white and their uniforms were nearly identical to what the big club Rockies would wear with the exception of pinstripes. The new identity for Bend was an instant success as the club sold more merchandise on opening night than the Bucks had sold in the entire previous season.

Season-by-season record

Former players
Bend Rockies players   (1992–1994)

References

External links
 Stats Crew Bend Rockies

Defunct Northwest League teams
Colorado Rockies minor league affiliates
Defunct baseball teams in Oregon
Professional baseball teams in Oregon
Sports in Bend, Oregon
Baseball teams disestablished in 1994
Baseball teams established in 1992